Markus Hameter (born 11 April 1980) is an Austrian football referee. He has refereed in the Austrian Bundesliga, the Swiss Super League and in international games featuring Georgia, Ukraine, Slovakia, Finland and Iran. Since 2012 he is FIFA listed.

References

1980 births
Living people
Austrian football referees